Syria competed at the 2006 Asian Games in Doha, Qatar. It  won a total of 6 medals.

Medals

Gold
  Swimming
Men's 50 m Freestyle: Rafd Zyad Al-Masri 4
  Weightlifting
Men's 105 kg: Ahed Joughili 6

Silver
Bodybuilding
Men's 90 Kilograms: Hassan Al-Saka 9 
 Karate
Men's Kumite 70 kg: Nawras Al-Hamawi
13

Bronze
 Wrestling
Men's Greco-Roman 96 kg: Muhammad Al Ken 9
 Boxing
Men's Heavyweight 91 kg: Naser Al-Shami 12

See also
 Syria at the 2005 Mediterranean Games

References

Nations at the 2006 Asian Games
2006
Asian Games